SupahPapalicious is a 2008 comedy film directed by Gilbert Perez and starring Vhong Navarro, Valerie Concepcion and Makisig Morales. It was distributed by Star Cinema.

Plot
The spurned lover Adonis (Vhong Navarro) has to win over Athena's only son, Atong (Makisig Morales), to court his single mom, Athena (Valerie Concepcion). Atong decides the only kind of man good enough for his mother is a man with a big family. Adonis' help from his friends to work in special effects to transformed into his pretending imaginary family in disguise: a spunky Lola and a wacky Black American to be able to win Athena's heart to convince Atong that Adonis is good enough to win the love of his life.

Cast and characters
 Vhong Navarro as Adonis/Dodong/Tita Barbara/Lola Paulina/Apl Dayap
 Valerie Concepcion as Athena/Ateng
 Makisig Morales as Atong
 Pokwang as Nymfa/Inday
 Baron Geisler as Sir Juno
 Julius 'Empoy' Marquez as Hercules
 Mura as Macho
 Marvin Raymundo as Eman Loloco/Dodong
 KitKat as Diosa
 Harold Billy Cells (cameo)
 Kiray Celis as Young Nymfa/Inday

Trivia
Supahpapalicious served as Valerie Concepion's first moviem under Star Cinema after she moved to ABS-CBN from rival GMA Network in 2007 and aside from her, Vhong Navarro and Pokwang were also both reunited from Agent X44.

See also
 Star Cinema

References

2008 films
2008 comedy films
Filipino-language films
Star Cinema films
Philippine comedy films